Marpalle is a village in Vikarabad district of the Indian state of Telangana. It is located in Marpalle mandal of Vikarabad revenue division.

References 

Villages in Vikarabad district
Mandal headquarters in Vikarabad district